Matz Willy Els Sels (born 26 February 1992) is a Belgian professional footballer who plays as a goalkeeper for Ligue 1 club Strasbourg and the Belgium national team.

Club career

Lierse SK
Sels started his youth career at Kontich, but transferred to Lierse at the age of seven. Over there, he started in 2010 in the first team. After the departure of Eiji Kawashima to Standard Liège in the summer of 2012, Sels became the first choice keeper. In his first game in the First Division, on 29 July 2012 against Gent, he saved a penalty. At the start of the 2013–2014 season, when he refused to sign a new contract, he was demoted to the second team.

KAA Gent
On 31 December 2013, it was announced that Sels would complete a transfer to KAA Gent once the transfer window opened. He would become the number one goalkeeper as Frank Boeckx's contract was due to expire at the end of the season. Sels made his debut for AA Gent on 14 January 2014 against K.V. Kortrijk, in the quarter finals of the Belgian Cup. He helped AA Gent qualify for the next round after penalties; with the game ending 1–1 on aggregate.

Sels played a key role in helping AA Gent become champions of the 2014–15 Belgian Pro League; the first national championship in their club history. This triumph allowed AA Gent to qualify for the 2015–16 UEFA Champions League.

On his Champions League debut Sels dramatically saved an Alexandre Lacazette penalty to help his side secure a 1–1 draw with Olympique Lyonnais. On 13 January 2016 he was voted Best Goalkeeper of Belgium 2015.

Newcastle United
On 29 June 2016, Sels completed a transfer to Newcastle United on a five-year contract for a reported transfer fee of £6.5 million. Sels made his Newcastle debut in the Championship on 5 August against Fulham. Sels kept a run of four clean sheets spanning 20 August to 13 September. Sels came under considerable fire from Newcastle fans for allowing a late equaliser from Aaron Tshibola at Aston Villa on 24 September. Despite receiving endorsement from manager Rafa Benítez during the week, Sels lost his place in the lineup to Karl Darlow against Norwich City on 28 September. His displacement from the lineup also received notable media coverage in his native Belgium. When Newcastle's next League Cup tilt came up, it was Sels who got the start, enjoying a clean sheet in a 6–0 victory over Preston North End on 25 October.

Anderlecht (loan)
On 22 June 2017, Sels signed for Anderlecht on a season-long loan.

Strasbourg
On 27 July 2018, Sels moved to French side RC Strasbourg Alsace for £3.5 million.

International career
Sels was called up to the Belgium squad in October 2015 for Euro 2016 qualifiers against Andorra and Israel. He was named in the Roberto Martinez Belgian squad for the friendly against Saudi Arabia in Brussels on 27 March.

In May 2018 he was named in Belgium's preliminary  squad for the 2018 World Cup in Russia. However, he did not make the final 23.

In May 2021, Sels was named in Belgium's provisional squad for the rescheduled UEFA Euro 2020.

He made his debut on 3 June 2021 in a friendly against Greece, substituting Simon Mignolet in the 90th minute.

Career statistics

Club

International

Honours
Gent
Belgian Pro League: 2014–15
Belgian Super Cup: 2015

Newcastle United
EFL Championship: 2016–17

Anderlecht
Belgian Super Cup: 2017

Strasbourg
Coupe de la Ligue: 2018–19

Individual
Belgian Professional Goalkeeper of the Season: 2015–16
Ligue 1 Goalkeeper of the Season: 2021-22

References

External links

1992 births
Living people
Belgian footballers
Belgian Pro League players
English Football League players
Ligue 1 players
Lierse S.K. players
K.A.A. Gent players
Newcastle United F.C. players
R.S.C. Anderlecht players
RC Strasbourg Alsace players
Belgium youth international footballers
Belgium under-21 international footballers
Belgium international footballers
Association football goalkeepers
Belgian expatriate footballers
Expatriate footballers in England
Expatriate footballers in France
UEFA Euro 2020 players